The Syms-Eaton Academy was America's first free public school. Also known as Syms-Eaton Free School, the school was established in Hampton, Virginia, in 1634. Twenty-five years later, in 1659, Thomas Eaton donated , buildings, livestock, and two slaves for the Eaton Charity School to serve the poor of Elizabeth City County. The schools were so popular that in 1759 a statute was passed to provide for the attendance of only poor children at Eaton School.

In 1805 the schools were merged by act of the Virginia General Assembly and called Hampton Academy, which in 1851 became part of the public school system. The school was burned during the Civil War and rebuilt after the war using money from the original trust fund.  The rebuilt school became Hampton High School in 1896.  The trust fund created from the Syms and Eaton donations has remained intact since the 17th century and was incorporated into support for the Hampton public school system.

A number of schools are successors in name or location, including:
Syms Middle School, a middle school feeding Kecoughtan High School, Hampton, Virginia
Eaton School, a middle school feeding Phoebus High School, Hampton, Virginia
Syms-Eaton Elementary School, a former school, now a pavilion in downtown Hampton, Virginia
 Hampton High School (Hampton, Virginia), is a public secondary school that is arguably a successor to the Syms-Eaton Academy
Eaton Fundamental Middle School, a feeder to Bethel High School (Hampton, Virginia)

References

Education in Hampton, Virginia
Defunct schools in Virginia
History of Hampton, Virginia